"Make Love Stay" is the title of a popular song from 1983 written and recorded by the American singer-songwriter Dan Fogelberg. It was one of two new songs included on his 1982 greatest hits album, along with the song "Missing You".

Fogelberg later described "Make Love Stay" in the liner notes to a retrospective album as a "sinuous piece written around a chapter of Tom Robbins' Still Life with Woodpecker" and as "a musical question that, unfortunately, eludes me still."

"Make Love Stay" peaked at No. 29 on the US Billboard Hot 100 chart in March 1983. It was Fogelberg's third song to top the Billboard adult contemporary chart, following his earlier hits "Longer" and "Leader of the Band".

Chart performance

See also
List of number-one adult contemporary singles of 1983 (U.S.)

References

External links
 

1983 singles
Dan Fogelberg songs
Songs written by Dan Fogelberg
Full Moon Records singles
1982 songs